The Women's 100 metre butterfly competition of the 2014 FINA World Swimming Championships (25 m) was held on 6 December with the heats and the semifinals and 7 December with the final.

Records
Prior to the competition, the existing world and championship records were as follows.

The following records were established during the competition:

Results

Heats
The heats were held at 11:31.

Semifinals
The semifinals were held at 19:02.

Semifinal 1

Semifinal 2

Final
The final was held at 18:52.

References

Women's 100 metre butterfly
2014 in women's swimming